The 1974 Asian Judo Championships were held in Seoul, South Korea November.

Medal overview

Men's events

Medals table

References
Judo Channel by Token Corporation

External links
Judo Union of Asia

Asian Judo Championships
Asian Championships
Asian Judo Championships
Judo Championships
1970s in Seoul
Sport in Seoul
Judo competitions in South Korea